Clare Kenny is a British musician who was a bassist for a number of artists and bands from the 1980s to the present day, including:

 Amazulu
 Shakespears Sister
 Orange Juice
 Coming up Roses
 Indigo Girls
 Sinéad O'Connor
 Damien Dempsey
 Andrea Corr
 Hank Wangford
 Edwyn Collins
 Aztec Camera
 Roddy Frame
 Brian Eno

She lives in London.

References

Living people
English bass guitarists
Women bass guitarists
Indigo Girls members
Musicians from London
Place of birth missing (living people)
Year of birth missing (living people)